Ryan Prescott may refer to:

 Ryan Prescott (Neighbours)
 Ryan Prescott (actor) (born 1989), English actor